Wang Dong (Chinese: 王栋; born 11 June 1985 in Tianjin) is a Chinese football player.

Club career
In 2004, Wang Dong started his professional footballer career with Beijing Guoan in the Chinese Super League. 

In February 2010, Wang transferred to Chinese Super League side Shenzhen Ruby.  He would eventually make his league debut for Beijing on 4 April 2010 in a game against Beijing Guoan.

Career statistics 

Statistics accurate as of match played 11 November 2014

References

1985 births
Living people
Chinese footballers
Footballers from Tianjin
Beijing Guoan F.C. players
Shenzhen F.C. players
Chinese Super League players
China League One players
Association football defenders